Nocardioides hungaricus is a Gram-positive and rod-shaped bacterium from the genus Nocardioides which has been isolated from a drinking water supply system in Budapest, Hungary.

References

External links
Type strain of Nocardioides hungaricus at BacDive -  the Bacterial Diversity Metadatabase

hungaricus
Bacteria described in 2011